Wave power in Australia is being developed as the country has a long and largely deep-water coastline. It is one of several regions of the world where wave power projects are being considered.

In early 2015 the Perth wave energy project was commissioned.

Projects
 Portland, Victoria, Australia - Ocean Power Technologies (Australasia) Pty Ltd is developing a 19 megawatts wave power station connected to the grid near Portland, Victoria. The project has received an AU $66.46 million grant from the Federal Government of Australia.
 Oceanlinx is trialling a wave energy system at Port Kembla - Thousands of air filled balloons are submerged under water and energy is collected by the changes in the depth of the water column changing the pressure in the balloons.
 A wave power project at Douglas Point, South Australia
 BioPower Systems are developing their bioWAVE system anchored to the seabed that would generate electricity through the movement of buoyant blades as waves pass, in a swaying motion similar to the way sea plants, such as kelp, move. It expects to complete pilot wave and tidal projects off northern Tasmania this year.
 Inside Western Australia, Carnegie Wave Energy are refining a technology called CETO, which uses energy captured from passing waves to generate high-pressure sea water. This is piped onshore to drive a turbine and to create desalinated water. The rise and fall of passing waves drives the pumps, generating water pressures of up to 1,000 pounds per square inch (psi). Carnegie's first commercial wave farm is due to be completed on Garden Island, near Perth, Western Australia, by mid 2014.
Wave Swell Energy is installing a trial wave generator unit in the harbour at Grassy, King Island.  It is a 200 kW unit which will be connected to the island's existing microgrid, which also utilises wind, solar, battery and diesel.

See also

 Renewable energy in Australia
Victoria Wave Power

References

Renewable energy in Australia
Australia